Beloved Life is a 1953 West German drama film directed by Rolf Thiele and starring Ruth Leuwerik, Carl Raddatz and Albert Lieven. Following her husband's release from a prisoner of war camp in 1947, a woman remembers their lives together since the pre-First World War era.

It was made at the Göttingen Studios and on location in Hamburg. The film's sets were designed by Walter Haag and Erich Kutzner.

Cast
Ruth Leuwerik as Louise von Bolin
Carl Raddatz as Carl von Bolin
Albert Lieven as Joachim von Bolin
Maria Sebaldt as Imke von Bolin
Karl Ludwig Diehl as Oberst von Bolin
Horst Hächler as Benno von Bolin
Harry Meyen as Jürgen von Bolin
Eva Bubat as Auguste, housekeeper

References

External links

1953 films
West German films
Films directed by Rolf Thiele
Bavaria Film films
German historical drama films
1950s historical drama films
Films set in the 1900s
Films set in the 1910s
Films set in the 1920s
Films set in the 1930s
Films set in the 1940s
1950s German-language films
German black-and-white films
1950s German films
Films shot in Hamburg
Films shot at Göttingen Studios